Jacob Hornik (יעקב הורניק) (born March 7, 1942 in Haifa, Israel) is a professor in marketing and communications, author of many books and researcher papers, and consultant; currently he is the Vice President and Head of the Management School at the w. Galil Academic College. Professor Hornik is the author of many marketing books, and recently published a new edition of the book Marketing Management with Professor Philip Kotler of Kellog University.
Nowadays his research focuses on two major research projects. 1. Applying advances Neuro-Imaging techniques to explore individual responses to marketing stimuli. 2. The use of Facet Meta theory in advertising models.
He also acts as a member of various Board of Directors and provides consulting services to leading companies and advertising agencies.
Professor Hornik is chairman of the Israeli "Superbrands" and "Product of the year" awards

Education and academic career 
Professor Hornik received his B.A. degree in economics and his M.B.A from the Hebrew University in Jerusalem. He then got a scholarship at Syracuse University for his Ph.D. in Business Administration.

Taught and lectured

Leon Recanati Graduate School of Business, Tel Aviv University. 
From 1994-1998 he was the Associate Dean of the School. 1998-2002, chair of the
Marketing Department. From 1988 (established) -1993, Chair the Health Systems Management
program. He was repeatedly recognized for his teaching abilities especially During the years 1991,1996 when he received
the Recanati Annual Teaching Award. In 2001 he was honored with the Rector’s
Outstanding Professor of the year

Western Galil Academic College 
Vice President and head of the Management School (Currently)

Peres Academic Center 
Dean, Management School

Visiting Professor 
The Kellogg-Northwestern University, University of Chicago, Bocconi University–Milan, New York University, Hong Kong University of Science and Technology , Chulalongkorn University - Bangkok,
ESSEC Business School–Paris, Universidad Catolica De Chile, University of Washington at Seattle, Erasmus Rotterdam and the European School of Business- London.

Selected publications

Books 

Philip Kotler & Jacob Hornik, Marketing Management: The Israeli Edition, 2002,2012 (in Hebrew), OU Publishing Tel Aviv.

Jacob Hornik & Y. Lieberman, Advertising Management, 1998 (in Hebrew), OU Publishing Tel Aviv.

Jacob Hornik, Surveys and Public Opinion Polls, 2001, (in Hebrew), OU Publishing Tel Aviv.

Articles 

“Inferring the distribution of households’ duration of residence”(with S. Anili and M. Israeli) Journal of Business and Economic Statistics, July 2000.

“Tactile stimulation and consumer response”, The Journal of Consumer Research, Dec.1992.

“Repeated advertising exposures: A system point approach to nonuniform insertions” (with P. Brill), Operations Research, Feb. 1988.

Audio and video appearances 
יעקב הורניק: תיאוריית הלקוח הנלהב

References

External links
Jacob Hornik in ResearchGate

Living people
1942 births
Israeli academic administrators
Business educators